Callinectes rathbunae is a species of swimming crab. It occurs in warm coastal waters of Mexico. The species is not used as food, but is kept in laboratories for research. The specific epithet rathbunae commemorates Mary J. Rathbun.

References

Portunoidea
Crustaceans of the Atlantic Ocean
Crustaceans described in 1930